Rubus adenotrichos is a Mesoamerican species of brambles in the rose family. It grows in Central America, northwestern South America, and central and southern Mexico, from Michoacán and Veracruz south to Ecuador and Venezuela.

Rubus adenotrichos is a shrub up to 6 meters tall, with copious hairs and scattered curved prickles. Leaves are compound with 3 or 5 leaflets. Flowers are white or pink. Fruits are red or black.

References

External links
 

adenotrichos
Flora of Mexico
Flora of South America
Flora of Central America
Plants described in 1839